John Codman Ropes (April 28, 1836October 28, 1899) was an American military historian and lawyer, and the co-founder of the law firm Ropes & Gray.

Early life 
Ropes was born on April 28, 1836 in Saint Petersburg, Russia, the son of a leading merchant of Boston who was engaged in business in Russia. At the age of fourteen, his family having returned to Massachusetts, he developed an infection of the spine which eventually became a permanent deformity.

He entered Harvard in 1853, and graduated in 1857. His interests as a young man were chiefly religious, legal and historical, and these remained with him throughout life, his career as a lawyer being conspicuous and successful. But it was the outbreak of the American Civil War in 1861 which fixed his attention principally on military history. He ceaselessly assisted with business and personal help and friendship the officers and men of the 20th Massachusetts regiment, in which his brother, Henry Ropes, was killed in action at Gettysburg, and after the war he devoted himself to the collection and elucidation of all obtainable evidence as to its incidents and events. In 1865, he co-founded the Boston-based law firm Ropes & Gray with John Chipman Gray.

Work
In this work his clear and unprejudiced legal mind enabled him to sift the truth from the innumerable public and private controversies, and the ill-informed allotment of praise and blame by the popular historians and biographers. The focus of his work was the Military Historical Society of Massachusetts, which he founded in 1876. The work of this society was the collection and discussion of evidence relating to the great conflict. Although practically every member of his society except himself had fought through the war, and many, such as Hancock and W. F. Smith, were general officers of great distinction, it was from first to last maintained and guided by Ropes, who presented to it his military library and his collection of prints and medals. He died in Boston, Massachusetts on October 28, 1899.

His principal work is an unfinished Story of the Civil War, to which he devoted most of his later years; this covers the years 1861-62. The Army under Pope is a detailed narration of the Virginia campaign of August–September 1862, which played a great part in reversing contemporary judgment on the events of those operations, notably as regards the unjustly-condemned General Fitz John Porter. Outside America, Ropes is known chiefly as the author of The Campaign of Waterloo, which is one of the standard works on the subject.

The greater part of his studies of the Civil War appears in the Military Historical Society's publications. Papers on the Waterloo campaign appeared in the Atlantic Monthly of June 1881, and in Scribner's Magazine of March and April 1888. Among his miscellaneous works is a paper on The Likenesses of Julius Caesar in Scribner's Magazine (February 1887).

See also
Ropes & Gray, law firm co-founded by Ropes

References

1836 births
1899 deaths
Lawyers from Boston
Harvard University alumni
19th-century American historians
People of Massachusetts in the American Civil War
Historians of the American Civil War
Massachusetts lawyers
American military historians
American male non-fiction writers
19th-century American male writers
People associated with Ropes & Gray
19th-century American lawyers
American people of Russian descent